The Harbinger Resistance is a fictional organization appearing in the Valiant Comics universe.

History
The Harbinger Resistance was started by the renegade Harbinger Faith Herbert, alias Zephyr, to combat the world dominating aspirations of Harbinger Foundation founder, Toyo Harada. Later on (according to Rai #0) this same resistance would be led by renegade Omega-class Harbinger Pete Stanchek, also called "Sting", a friend of Zephyr, who would mysteriously disappear around the year 2056. Leadership of the resistance would end in the hands of Peter Stanchek's descendant, John Stanchek, who would defeat Toyo Harada.

It is of important note that on a journey into the 20th century, Magnus, Robot Fighter would be the one to convince Zephyr to found the resistance in the first place, stating that it was her destiny to do so..

Valiant Comics characters
Valiant Comics superheroes